Blažo Igumanović (born 16 January 1986) is a Montenegrin footballer who plays as a left back for KF Liria in Kosovo.

Club career
In July 2013, Igumanović moved to Kazakhstan Premier League side FC Astana.

On 22 December 2016, Igumanović signed a 6-month contract with Bulgarian First League club Montana, with an option for another year. He left the club in June 2017 as the extension clause was not activated following the relegation to Second League.

On 1 August 2017, Igumanović signed with Budućnost Podgorica. 

At the end of January 2020, Igumanović joined Liria Prizren in Kosovo.

International career
Igumanović made his debut for Montenegro in a November 2012 FIFA World Cup qualification match against San Marino and has earned a total of 2 caps, scoring no goals. His second and final international was a March 2014  friendly match against Ghana.

References

External links
 
 
 
 

1986 births
Living people
Footballers from Podgorica
Association football fullbacks
Serbia and Montenegro footballers
Montenegrin footballers
Montenegro international footballers
OFK Titograd players
FK Zeta players
FK Rudar Pljevlja players
FC Astana players
FK Sutjeska Nikšić players
Zawisza Bydgoszcz players
FC Montana players
FK Budućnost Podgorica players
FK Lovćen players
KF Liria players
Second League of Serbia and Montenegro players
First League of Serbia and Montenegro players
Montenegrin First League players
Kazakhstan Premier League players
I liga players
First Professional Football League (Bulgaria) players
Montenegrin expatriate footballers
Expatriate footballers in Kazakhstan
Montenegrin expatriate sportspeople in Kazakhstan
Expatriate footballers in Poland
Montenegrin expatriate sportspeople in Poland
Expatriate footballers in Bulgaria
Montenegrin expatriate sportspeople in Bulgaria
Expatriate footballers in Kosovo
Montenegrin expatriate sportspeople in Kosovo